The Geelvink Bay flying fox or Geelvink Bay fruit bat (Pteropus pohlei) is a species of flying fox in the family Pteropodidae. It is endemic to the islands of Yapen, Numfor, and Rani, which lie north of New Guinea in Indonesia's Papua Province. The name comes from Geelvink Bay, now Cenderawasih Bay. 

It is common over a small area, and the population trend is decreasing.  Major threats to the species are loss of habitat due to timber harvesting, and hunting.

Sources

Pteropus
Bats of Oceania
Bats of Indonesia
Mammals of Papua New Guinea
Mammals of Western New Guinea
Cenderawasih Bay
Vulnerable fauna of Asia
Vulnerable fauna of Oceania
Mammals described in 1933
Taxonomy articles created by Polbot
Biak–Numfoor rain forests
Yapen Islands
Bats of New Guinea